Klädesholmen is an island and village in Tjörn Municipality, Bohuslän, Sweden. The urban area, with 385 inhabitants in 2010, located on two small islands, Klädesholmen and Koholmen, is connected to Tjörn via a bridge to Bleket. The islands were formerly crown islets, where fishermen had the right to settle.

References 

Populated places in Västra Götaland County
Populated places in Tjörn Municipality